Eisenhower's farewell address (sometimes referred to as "Eisenhower's farewell address to the nation") was the final public speech of Dwight D. Eisenhower as the 34th President of the United States, delivered in a television broadcast on January 17, 1961. Perhaps best known for advocating that the nation guard against the potential influence of the military–industrial complex, a term he is credited with coining, the speech also expressed concerns about planning for the future and the dangers of massive spending, especially deficit spending, the prospect of the domination of science through federal funding and, conversely, the domination of science-based public policy by what he called a "scientific-technological elite". This speech and Eisenhower's Chance for Peace speech have been called the "bookends" of his administration.

Background

Eisenhower served as  president for two full terms from January 1953 to January 1961, and was the first U.S. president to be term-limited from seeking re-election again. He had overseen a period of considerable economic expansion, even as the Cold War deepened. Three of his national budgets had been balanced, but spending pressures mounted. The recent presidential election had resulted in the election of John F. Kennedy, and the oldest American president in a century was about to hand the reins of power to the youngest elected president.

The speech

As early as 1959, Eisenhower began working with his brother Milton and his speechwriters, including his chief speechwriter Malcolm Moos, to develop his final statement as he left public life. It went through at least 21 drafts. The speech was "a solemn moment in a decidedly unsolemn time", warning a nation "giddy with prosperity, infatuated with youth and glamour, and aiming increasingly for the easy life."

Despite his military background and being the only general to be elected president in the 20th century, he warned the nation with regard to the corrupting influence of what he describes as the "military-industrial complex".

Scientific-technological elite
He also expressed his concomitant concern for corruption of the scientific process as part of this centralization of funding in the Federal government, and vice versa:

Legacy
Although it was much broader, Eisenhower's speech is remembered primarily for its reference to the military-industrial complex. The phrase gained acceptance during the Vietnam War era and 21st-century commentators have expressed the opinion that a number of the fears raised in his speech have come true.
The speech has been adapted as an oratory for orchestra and orator. The speech was depicted in the opening of the 1991 film JFK.

References

Notes

External links
 Video of television broadcast of speech
 Fifty Years After Eisenhower's Farewell Address, A Look at Prophets of War video report by Democracy Now!
 Full text and audio of the speech at AmericanRhetoric.com

1961 speeches
Speeches by Dwight D. Eisenhower
1961 in American politics
Military–industrial complex
January 1961 events in the United States
Farewell addresses